Mayrisch is a surname. Notable people with the surname include:

Aline Mayrisch de Saint-Hubert (1874–1947), Luxembourgian women's rights campaigner, socialite, philanthropist
Émile Mayrisch (1862–1928), Luxembourgian industrialist and businessman
Lycée Aline Mayrisch, high school in Luxembourg City, in southern Luxembourg
Stade Émile Mayrisch, football and athletics stadium, in Esch-sur-Alzette, in south-western Luxembourg

See also
Mayres (disambiguation)
Mirisch
Myrice, a genus of moths in the family Geometridae